James Craigen (born 28 March 1991) is an English professional footballer who plays as a midfielder for Edinburgh in Scottish League One. He started his career at Preston North End, where he spent 10 years as a youth player. He was also part of the Edinburgh University team; the university which he was a student at. He then made the leap from non-league football to Scotland's second tier, joining Scottish First Division club Partick Thistle where, against Greenock Morton, he scored the decisive goal that sealed Thistle's promotion to the Scottish Premiership. He has also spent time on loan at Forfar Athletic, and after leaving Partick Thistle, played with Raith Rovers, Falkirk, Dunfermline Athletic and Arbroath.

Career

Youth
Craigen played for the Edinburgh University football side, while concentrating on his academic studies. He also turned out for the Scottish University side when they won the BUCS Home Nations Tournament. Craigen was selected for  the Great Britain University side at the 2011 Student Games in Japan, where the team finished runners-up.

Partick Thistle
Craigen signed for Partick Thistle at the start of the 2012–13 Season, whilst also completing his final year at university. He joined Forfar Athletic on loan in October 2012, and returned to Thistle in early 2013. He scored twice during his loan period.

On his return to Partick Thistle, Craigen established himself in the starting eleven during the title run-in. He scored the only goal in a 1–0 victory at home to Morton in April 2013, a victory that essentially secured the league title for Partick Thistle.

In May 2015, Craigen was named as one of the players that would be released by Partick Thistle at the end of the 2014–15 season.

Raith Rovers
Craigen signed for Scottish Championship side Raith Rovers on 26 June 2015.

Falkirk
On 10 March 2016, Craigen signed a pre contract deal with fellow Scottish Championship side Falkirk. In his first season with the club, Craigen helped Falkirk to a second-place finish in the league, playing 27 matches and scoring 3 goals. He scored a further two goals in each of the Scottish Premiership semi-final play-offs against Dundee United, although the Bairns fell short of reaching the final after losing 3–4 on aggregate.

Craigen was a bit-part player in his second season at the club, and was subsequently released in January 2018, after a year and a half with the club.

Dunfermline Athletic
Craigen subsequently signed for Scottish Championship and Falkirk-rivals Dunfermline Athletic on 19 January 2018, on a deal that would keep him at the club until summer 2018. Craigen's contract was renewed until May 2019, after which point it was announced that he would be leaving the club in order to seek a fresh challenge.

Career statistics

References

External links

1991 births
Living people
English footballers
Partick Thistle F.C. players
Forfar Athletic F.C. players
Raith Rovers F.C. players
Falkirk F.C. players
Dunfermline Athletic F.C. players
AFC Fylde players
Arbroath F.C. players
Association football midfielders
Scottish Football League players
Scottish Professional Football League players
Footballers from Preston, Lancashire
F.C. Edinburgh players